The Maze is an American horror film, directed by Stephen Shimek and starring
Shalaina Castle, Brandon Sean Pearson, Clare Niederpruem, Kyle Paul and Will Tye Nelson. With a budget of $200,000, it was released to theaters on 19 October 2010.

Plot
A group of five teenagers who sneak into a corn maze after hours are stalked by a psychopathic killer.

References

External links

2010 films
2010 horror films
American horror films
Mazes
2010s English-language films
2010s American films